The Swedish Open is a squash tournament held in Linköping, Sweden in February. It is part of the PSA World Tour. The event has been played since the middle of the seventies.

Past results

References

External links
- Official website
- PSA Swedish open 2012

Squash tournaments in Sweden
Recurring sporting events established in 2010
Squash in Sweden